Trachelyichthys is a genus of driftwood catfishes found in tropical South America.

Species 
There are currently two described species in this genus:
 Trachelyichthys decaradiatus Mees, 1974
 Trachelyichthys exilis D. W. Greenfield & Glodek, 1977

References

Auchenipteridae
Fish of South America
Catfish genera
Taxa named by Gerlof Mees